Executive Technologies, Inc. develops Enterprise Content Management, document management and document imaging software. 
 
The product is delivered in two versions, one that uses Microsoft SQL for the document repository and one that uses the SearchExpress search engine.

Features 
SearchExpress provides capture, indexing, workflow, searching and document management and process automation for digital documents as well as paper documents.  SearchExpress can use Artificial Intelligence to replace manual data entry. 
SearchExpress is used to provide a paperless office for small and large enterprises, including doctor's offices.
SearchExpress includes a voice digital assistant called Cyber Express.

See also
Document Management
Enterprise Content Management
Paperless Office
Workflow Application
Document Imaging
Records Management

References 

https://en.wikipedia.org/wiki/Executive_Technologies
Document management systems
Content management systems
Business software companies